Def Jam Recordings Africa (marketed as Def Jam Africa), is the African division of the international record label Def Jam Recordings. The label is owned by Universal Music Africa, a flagship of Universal Music Group. Founded in 2020, and operating in South Africa, Nigeria, Côte d'Ivoire, Senegal, and Cameroon. Def Jam Africa specializes mainly on African hip-hop, Afrobeats and Trap music.

History
Def Jam Recordings Africa was founded in 2020, as the African division of Def Jam Recordings, operating in South Africa, and Nigeria. The label has a Johannesburg-based arm known as Universal Music South Africa and a Lagos-based arm known as Universal Music Group Nigeria, both headed by Sipho Dlamini, the Chief executive officer of Universal Music Sub-Saharan Africa & South Africa. The label is home to recording acts, such as Boity, Nasty C, Nadia Nakai, Larry Gaaga, Ricky Tyler, Tshego, Ténor, Tellaman, Luka Pryce, Tumi "Stogie T" Molekane, Omzo Dollar, Vector, Lucas Raps, Cassper Nyovest, Suspect 95, and Stonebwoy.

On 13 June 2022, Larry Gaaga, the CEO and founder of Gaaga Muzik, and the former general manager of YSG Entertainment, was announced as the vice president of Def Jam Africa, and the head of the A&R division across the English-speaking markets in Africa.

Vice presidents
Larry Gaaga

Artists
African artists signed to Def Jam Africa:

Nasty C
Boity Thulo
Nadia Nakai
Larry Gaaga
Ricky Tyler
Tellaman
Luka Pryce
Stogie T
Suspect 95
Vector
Omzo Dollar
Cassper Nyovest
Lucas Raps
Tshego
Ténor
Stonebwoy

Selected discography
Singles, Albums and Eps, released through Def Jam Africa:

Singles

Albums & EPs

See also 
Def Jam Recordings

References

2020 establishments in Nigeria
2020 establishments in South Africa
South African record labels
Nigerian record labels
Universal Music Group